Butteville is a census-designated place and unincorporated community in Marion County, Oregon, United States. For statistical purposes, the United States Census Bureau has defined Butteville as a census-designated place (CDP). The census definition of the area may not precisely correspond to local understanding of the area with the same name. As of the 2020 census the population was 273. It is part of the Salem Metropolitan Statistical Area.

History

Butteville was founded in the 1840s by members of the Methodist Mission. Butteville was once served by steamboats running on the Willamette River. Butteville saw the peak of its economy in the 1850s, as it competed with neighboring Champoeg, Oregon for shipping business from the surrounding French Prairie. Most of Butteville's early residents were French-Canadian.

Geography

Demographics

As of the census of 2000, there were 293 people, 106 households, and 83 families residing in the CDP. The population density was 282 people per square mile (108.8/km2). There were 113 housing units at an average density of 108.8 per square mile (42.0/km2). The racial makeup of the CDP was 95.56% White, 2.05% Native American, 0.34% Asian, 1.71% from other races, and 0.34% from two or more races. Hispanic or Latino of any race were 2.73% of the population.

There were 106 households, out of which 33% had children under the age of 18 living with them, 74.5% were married couples living together, 4.7% had a female householder with no husband present, and 20.8% were non-families. 17.9% of all households were made up of individuals, and 9.4% had someone living alone who was 65 years of age or older. The average household size was 2.76 and the average family size was 3.18.

In the CDP, the population was spread out, with 28.7% under the age of 18, 4.1% from 18 to 24, 21.5% from 25 to 44, 34.1% from 45 to 64, and 11.6% who were 65 years of age or older. The median age was 42 years. For every 100 females, there were 98.0 males. For every 100 females age 18 and over, there were 99.0 males.
The median income for a household in the CDP was $36,429, and the median income for a family was $65,625. Males had a median income of $71,875 versus $26,607 for females. The per capita income for the CDP was $31,258. About 9.7% of families and 12.4% of the population were below the poverty line, including none of those under the age of eighteen or sixty five or over.

See also

 Champoeg, Oregon
 François X. Matthieu
 French Prairie
List of ghost towns in Oregon
 Steamboats of the Willamette River

References

External links
 
 Butteville:The Tale of a River Town
 Historic photos of Butteville from Salem Public Library

Census-designated places in Oregon
Ghost towns in Oregon
Salem, Oregon metropolitan area
Unincorporated communities in Marion County, Oregon
1840s establishments in Oregon
Populated places on the Willamette River
Census-designated places in Marion County, Oregon
Unincorporated communities in Oregon